Mihaela Pogǎcean (née Stoica, born 27 January 1958) is a Romanian former hurdler. Her best times of 7.86 secs (1988) for the 60 metres hurdles and 12.62 secs (1990) for the 100 metres hurdles, still stand as Romanian records.

International competitions

References

1958 births
Living people
Romanian female hurdlers